A point-of-sale display (POS display) is a specialised form of sales promotion that is found near, on, or next to a checkout counter (the "point of sale"). They are intended to draw the customers' attention to products, which may be new products, or on special offer, and are also used to promote special events, e.g. seasonal or holiday-time sales. POS displays can include free standing display units (FSDU), shelf edging, dummy packs, strut cards, standees, hanging signs, counter display units (CDU), display packs, endcaps, display stands, mobiles, posters, and banners.

POS can also refer to systems used to record transactions between the customer and the commerce.

Examples
Usually, in smaller retail outlets, POS displays are supplied by the manufacturer of the products, and also sited, restocked and maintained by one of their regular salespersons. This is less common in large supermarkets as they can control the activities of their suppliers due to their large purchasing power, and prefer to use their own material designed to be consistent with their corporate theme and store layout.

Common items that may appear in POS displays year-round are batteries, soft drinks, candy, chewing gum, magazines, comics, tobacco, and writable CDs and DVDs. These displays are also useful in outlets with limited floor space, as there tends to be much wasted space around counters.

The displays are normally covered with branding for the product they are trying to sell, and are made out of cardboard or foamboard, and/or a covering over a plastic or acrylic stand, all intended to be easily replaceable and disposable. This allows designers to make full use of color and printing to make the display visually appealing. Some displays are fixed or non-disposable. These may include lighting to make the display more visible and may also contain a cooler for drinks or ice cream.  Some are no more than a metal basket, with no design on the outside, simply showing a price. These types of display are easier to refill.

Lightboxes
In the field of POS displays, a "lightbox" is a display fixture (or a modular component of a larger POS display structure) that contains a translucent graphic film with lamps that transmit light through the graphic, thus "backlighting" the graphic message for increased visibility, brightness and contrast relative to its surroundings. By definition, the artwork or backlit graphic film (aka "duratrans") in a POS lightbox is replaceable without discarding the lightbox or any of its other components.

Lightboxes have historically been lighted with fluorescent lamps due to their (a) cooler operating temperature than incandescent; (b) relatively low power consumption; and (c) inherent diffusive property. As in most commercial lighting applications, there has been a significant shift in the late 20th and early 21st century toward LED lamps in POS lightboxes, for not just the universally-acknowledged benefit of economy but also of practicality, as LED lamps are more durable and impact-resistant in shipping, handling and public applications such as Point-of-Sale. Motion LED lightboxes are a variation on traditional lightboxes, and use programmed LEDs behind a display to create the impression of movement.

Note: the definition of "lightbox" as it relates to POS displays is similar to but distinct from that of a lightbox in the Photography and Graphic Arts industries. The similarity is that they both contain lamps whose light is diffused to uniformly backlight a translucent image. The distinction is that a POS lightbox is a permanent or semi-permanent fixture used to display an advertising message in a retail space, while a photography lightbox is usually a portable or table-mounted appliance used for image quality analysis and/or tracing in a photography studio, graphic design studio, graphic/print production shop or similar environment.

Free Standing Display Units (FSDU)

Free standing display units are designed to attract the attention of customers and promote key retail products or messages. They are often placed strategically within the customer journey, and utilize bright colours and graphics to stand out visually and encourage shoppers to buy. Retailers have been criticized for using FSDUs near checkouts to promote sugary snacks.

FSDUs are generally made from cardboard. This reduces production costs, and makes them easy to transport and assemble, while being robust enough for use in a retail environment.

See also
 Sales promotion
 Packaging and labelling
 Point of Sale System

References

Marketing techniques
Sales promotion
Retail store elements